Isidoro Beaton Stadium is a multi-purpose stadium in Belmopan, Belize. It is used mostly for football matches and is the home stadium of the Belizean football clubs Belmopan Blaze and Belmopan Bandits. The stadium is able to hold 2,500 people. It is also the most commonly used Belize national football team's home venue.

References

External links
Isidoro Beaton Stadium Project 
https://edition.channel5belize.com/archives/126420

Belize Premier Football League home stadiums
Football venues in Belmopan
Multi-purpose stadiums in Belize
Buildings and structures in Belmopan